Mesr (also Romanized as Meşr and Maşr) is a village in Jandaq Rural District, in the Central District of Khur and Biabanak County, Isfahan Province, Iran. At the 2006 census, its population was 183, in 41 families.

References 

Populated places in Khur and Biabanak County